Leucania humidicola is a species of moth of the family Noctuidae. It is found from the Antilles to Brazil and probably the Galapagos.

The larvae have been recorded on Sporoholus virginicus.

External links
 Species info
 The Large Moths Of Guana Island, British Virgin Islands: A Survey Of Efficientcolonizers (Sphingidae, Notodontidae, Noctuidae, Arctiidae, Geometridae,Hyblaeidae, Cossidae)

Leucania
Moths described in 1852